Polabian may refer to:

 Polabian language, an extinct Slavic language spoken by Polabians
 Polabians, an extinct Slavic tribe living in the eastern part of today's Germany